The 2009–10 NOJHL season is the 32nd season of the Northern Ontario Junior Hockey League (NOJHL). The eight teams of the East and West Divisions will play 50-game schedules.

Come February, the top teams of each division will play down for the Copeland-McNamara Trophy, the NOJHL championship.  The winner of the Copeland-McNamara Trophy will compete in the Central Canadian Junior "A" championship, the Dudley Hewitt Cup.  If successful against the winners of the Ontario Junior Hockey League and Superior International Junior Hockey League, the champion would then move on to play in the Canadian Junior Hockey League championship, the 2010 Royal Bank Cup.

Changes 
North Bay Skyhawks change their name to North Bay Trappers.

Current Standings 

Note: GP = Games played; W = Wins; L = Losses; OTL = Overtime losses; SL = Shootout losses; GF = Goals for; GA = Goals against; PTS = Points; x = clinched playoff berth; y = clinched division title; z = clinched conference title

Teams listed on the official league website.

Standings listed on official league website.

2009-10 Copeland-McNamara Trophy Playoffs

Playoff results are listed on the official league website.

Dudley Hewitt Cup Championship
Hosted by the Soo Thunderbirds in Sault Ste. Marie, Ontario.  Soo finished in third, Abitibi finished fourth.

Round Robin
Oakville Blades (OJAHL) 6 - Abitibi Eskimos 0
Fort William North Stars (SIJHL) 3 - Soo Thunderbirds 2 OT
Abitibi Eskimos 4 - Fort William North Stars 3 OT
Oakville Blades (OJAHL) 3 - Soo Thunderbirds 1
Soo Thunderbirds 4 - Abitibi Eskimos 3

Semi-final
Fort William North Stars (SIJHL) 3 - Soo Thunderbirds 0

Scoring leaders 
Note: GP = Games played; G = Goals; A = Assists; Pts = Points; PIM = Penalty minutes

Leading goaltenders 
Note: GP = Games played; Mins = Minutes played; W = Wins; L = Losses: OTL = Overtime losses; SL = Shootout losses; GA = Goals Allowed; SO = Shutouts; GAA = Goals against average

Awards
Player of the Year - Felix Boutin (Abitibi Eskimos)
Most Valuable Player - Eddie Davey (Abitibi Eskimos)
Most Gentlemanly Player - Chris Pontes (Sudbury Jr. Wolves)
Rookie of the Year - Brett Findlay (Blind River Beavers)
Top Defenceman - Bronson Kovacs (Soo Thunderbirds)
Most Improved Player - Mathew Pepin (North Bay Trappers)
Top Defensive Forward - Brodie Barron (North Bay Trappers)
Top "Team Player" - Jerry Petingalo (Soo Thunderbirds)
Director of the Year - Al Jones (Soo Thunderbirds)
Coach of the Year - Paul Gagne (Abitibi Eskimos)
Team Goaltending Award - Eddie Davey, Chandler Long (Abitibi Eskimos)
Top Goals Against Average - Eddie Davey (Abitibi Eskimos)
Scoring Champion - Felix Boutin (Soo Thunderbirds)
Scholastic Player of the Year - Bronson Kovacs (Soo Thunderbirds)
Playoffs Most Valuable Player - Matt St. Jacques (Abitibi Eskimos)

See also 
 2010 Royal Bank Cup
 Dudley Hewitt Cup
 List of NOHA Junior A seasons
 Ontario Junior Hockey League
 Superior International Junior Hockey League
 Greater Ontario Junior Hockey League

References

External links 
 Official website of the Northern Ontario Junior Hockey League
 Official website of the Canadian Junior Hockey League

NOJHL
Northern Ontario Junior Hockey League seasons